Dàndàn yōuqíng is a 1983 Mandarin Chinese album by Teresa Teng, first distributed by Polydor Records, Ltd. (also called Polygram now owned by Universal Music Group), from Hong Kong and Kolin Records from Taiwan. It contains twelve songs, which use poems from the Tang and Song Dynasties as lyrics.

Names 
Various sources translate the name of the album into different English-language names. The journal CHIME: European Foundation For Chinese Music Research translates the name to Passionate Feelings.
Sinorama (now Taiwan Panorama), Biographical Dictionary of Chinese Women: The Twentieth Century – 1912–2000, and Encyclopædia Britannica translate it to Faded Feelings.
China Radio International translates it to Light Exquisite Feeling.

Track listing 
Each of the following poems was written from the Tang Dynasty to the Song Dynasty.

Total length – 39:26

Side A 
 "Alone in the West Tower" ( du shang xi lou) – 2:45
 Music by Liu Chia-chang, arranged by Lu Dongni
 Poem: "Grief" ( ai si), segment of "Happy reunion" ( xiang jian huan) by Li Yu from Southern Tang 
 "Wishing We Last Forever" ( danyuan ren changjiu) – 4:06
 Music by Liang Hongzhi, arranged by Xiao Weichen
 Poem："Water song" ( shui diao ge tou) by Su Shi from Song era 
 "How many worries?" ( ji duo chou) – 3:33
 Music by Tan Jianchang, arranged by Chen Yang
 Poem: "Papaver rhoeas [Corn poppy]" ( yu mei ren) by Li Yu from Southern Tang
 "Ruthless Grass" ( fang cao wuqing) – 3:02
 Composed and arranged by Zhong Zhaofeng
 Poem: "Basil garden" ( su mu zhe) by Fan Zhongyan from Song era
 "Eternal night" ( qing ye youyou) – 2:47
 Music by Gu Yue, arranged by Lu Dongni
 Poem: "Old friend from Taoyuan" ( taoyuan yi guren) by Qin Shaoyou from Song era
 "My unexpected feelings" ( you sheizhi wo zishi qing) – 3:52
 Music by Wong Jim, arranged by Joseph Koo
 Poem: "Partridge at the sky" ( zhegu tian) by Nie Shengqiong from Song era

Total length in Side A – 20:05

Side B 

 "Rouge tears" ( yan zhilei) – 3:04
 Music by Liu Jiachang, arranged by Ao Jinbao
 Poem: "Night sounds" ( wu ye ti), segment of "Happy reunion" ( xiang jian huan) by Li Yu from Southern Tang
 "Sounds of Leaves" ( Wan ye qian sheng) – 3:06
 Music by Liu Jiachang, arranged by Lu Dongni
 Poem: "Jade House in Spring" ( yu lou chun) by Ouyang Xiu from Song era
 "Around the evening" ( Ren yue huanghun hou) – 2:45
 Music by Weng Qingxi, arranged by Lu Dongni
 Poem: "" ( sheng cha zi) by Ouyang Xiu from Song era
 "Seeing Tears" ( xiangkan lei yan) – 3:49
 Music by Gu Yue, arranged by Chen Yang
 Poem: "" (Yu lin ling) by Liu Yong from Song era
 "Remaining Silent" ( yu shuo huan xiu) – 2:50
 Music by Zhong Zhaofeng, arranged by Xiao Weichen
 Poem: "Homely slave" ( chou nur) by Xin Qiji from Song era
 "Thinking about you" ( si jun) – 3:47
 Composed and arranged by Chen Yang
 Poem: "Separate Entities: I live in Yangtze River" ( bu suanzi: wo zhu Chang Jiang tou) by Li Ziyi from Song era

Total length in Side B – 19:21

Reception 
As of August 2008, five million copies had been sold, making it one of the best-selling albums in Asia. In March 2012, Pu Xiqian from the China News Service called this album a "perfect match" of "outstanding" composition and ancient Chinese poems. The record producer of this album, Deng Xiquan, won the Best Record Producer Award of the 1983 RTHK Top 10 Gold Songs Awards, held in 1983.

References

External links

 "Word dictionary – 淡淡幽情." MDBG Chinese-English Dictionary, 2012. Web. 24 April 2012.
 "Light Motion." YesAsia 27 April 2012. Web. 27 April 2012. Out-of-stock product.

1983 albums
Teresa Teng albums
Mandarin-language albums
Chinese poems
Polydor Records albums